Renova Group is a Russian conglomerate with interests in aluminium, oil, energy, telecoms and a variety of other sectors. The main owner and president is Viktor Vekselberg who founded the company in 1990.

The Renova Group is primarily active in Russia, the C.I.S. states, Switzerland, South Africa and the United States. Its major assets include participation in the oil company TNK-BP and in aluminum producer RUSAL.

Renova maintains very close ties to both Saudi Arabia and the Arab world as a member of the Russian-Saudi Economic Council and the Russian-Saudi and Russian-Arab Business Councils which are part of the Chamber of Commerce and Industry (CCI). Vladimir Yevtushenkov, who founded and controls Sistema, is the chairman of both the Russian-Saudi and Russian-Arab Business Councils since 2002.

In 2010 Renova Group entered into an agreement to provide funding for Fort Ross. It is parent company of private equity firm Columbus Nova.

United States sanctions 
In April 2018, the United States Treasury announced that it would impose sanctions on several Russian oligarchs, including Viktor Vekselberg and Renova Group. The sanctions were due to alleged tampering in the 2016 United States presidential election by Russian entities (including Vekselberg), and other unspecified activities.

References

External links 
  Renova Group website—
 Made in Russia.ru: catalogue of Renova Group

 
Conglomerate companies of Russia
Conglomerate companies established in 1990
Non-renewable resource companies established in 1990
1990 establishments in Russia
Russian entities subject to the U.S. Department of the Treasury sanctions